The men's Greco-Roman heavyweight was a Greco-Roman wrestling event held as part of the Wrestling at the 1920 Summer Olympics programme. It was the third appearance of the event. Heavyweight was the heaviest category, including wrestlers weighing over 82.5 kilograms.

A total of 19 wrestlers from 12 nations competed in the event, which was held from August 17 to August 20, 1920.

Results

Gold medal round

Silver medal round

Bronze medal round

References

External links
 
 

Wrestling at the 1920 Summer Olympics
Greco-Roman wrestling